Simon Daniels may refer to:
 Simon Daniels (cricketer)
 Simon Daniels (musician)